Lani Groves (born 1980 in Bloemfontein) is a South African musician and actor. She began playing the cello and singing at the age of five years. Groves performs regularly at musical events across the Gauteng region in South Africa.

In 2004, Groves played a bar-lady in The Res by Franz Marx, after which she played various characters for South African television programs such as Society, 7de Laan, and Kompleks for the KykNet channel.

From 2006 to 2011, Groves co-founded the band Electro Muse (now known as The Muses), an electric string quartet. Groves also previously played as part of the group Ménage à Troi,s as well as performing as a backing artist to a number of other musicians.

In 2009 she starred in a locally produced film The Dykumentary for the Out of Africa film festival.

In 2011, Groves featured as a cellist and backing singer on Laurie Levine's third album Six Winters, and contributed to a band called Tango Loca specialising in Argentinian Tango and French cafe style music.

In 2012 Groves became a semi-permanent partner to Laurie Levine at live performances.

In 2012, alongside actor and musician Tiaan Rautenbach, Groves formed a new band called Soozie and the Cheesewagon, specializing in acoustic blues.

References

External links
 Official site

1980 births
Living people
People from Bloemfontein
Cellists
South African musicians
Women cellists
21st-century women musicians
21st-century cellists